Stardew Valley is a simulation role-playing video game developed by Eric "ConcernedApe" Barone. Players take the role of a character who inherits their deceased grandfather's dilapidated farm in a place known as Stardew Valley. The game was released for Windows in February 2016 before being ported to other platforms. 

Stardew Valley is open-ended, allowing players to grow crops, raise livestock, fish, cook, mine, forage, and socialize with the townspeople, including the ability to marry and have children. It allows up to four players to play online together.

Barone developed Stardew Valley by himself over four and a half years. He was heavily inspired by the Harvest Moon series, with additions to address some of the shortcomings of those games. He used it as an exercise to improve his own programming and game design skills. British studio Chucklefish approached Barone midway through development with the offer to publish the game, allowing him to focus more on completing it. 

Stardew Valley was praised by critics, who highlighted the game's music, characters, and relaxing qualities, with it later being cited as one of the greatest video games of all time. Yasuhiro Wada, the creator of Harvest Moon, also praised the game for retaining the freedom that later entries of his series had lost. The game was a commercial success, selling over 20 million copies by 2022.

Gameplay

Stardew Valley is a farming simulation game primarily inspired by the Harvest Moon video game series. At the start of the game, players create a character, who becomes the recipient of a plot of land and a small house once owned by their grandfather in a small town called Pelican Town. Players may select from several different farm types, each with a unique theme and different benefits and drawbacks. The farmland is initially overrun with boulders, trees, stumps, and weeds, and players must work to clear them to restart the farm, tending to crops and livestock to generate revenue and further expand the farm's buildings and facilities.

Players interact with non-player characters (NPCs) that inhabit the town, including engaging in relationships with them; this can culminate in marriage, which results in the NPC helping the player's character to tend the farm.  After marriage, players may have the chance to have or adopt a child with their spouse.  Players can also engage in fishing, cooking, crafting, and exploring procedurally-generated caves with materials and ores to mine or creatures to combat. Players can take on various quests to earn additional money or complete specific collections of materials (called "bundles") to restore the town's Community Center or pay certain amounts of money to complete JojaMart bundles. Completing bundles rewards players with various items, including seeds and tools. Completing multiple bundles grants players access to new areas and game mechanics, such as a desert. All of these activities must be metered against the character's current health and exhaustion level, and the game's internal clock. The player can consume food that grants certain buffs that are useful in certain activities and situations. Food is also a source of replenishing health and energy, which allows the player to complete more tasks in a given day. The game uses a simplified calendar, each year having four 28-day months that represent each season, that determines which crops can be grown and which activities can be beneficial. Later in the game, players can restore a greenhouse and an island that can grow any crop regardless of the season.

Development
Stardew Valley was created by American indie game designer Eric Barone, under the alias of ConcernedApe and originally titled Sprout Valley. In 2011, Barone had graduated from the University of Washington Tacoma with a computer science degree, but had not been able to get a job in the industry, instead working as an usher at the Paramount Theatre in Seattle. Looking to improve his computer skills for better job prospects, he came to the idea of crafting a game which would also pull in his artistic side. Growing up in the Pacific Northwest, Barone incorporated many elements of the region into the gameplay and art.

Stardew Valley originally began as a modern fan-made alternative to the Harvest Moon series, as he felt the series had gotten "progressively worse" after Harvest Moon: Back to Nature. Unable to find a satisfactory replacement, Barone began to create a game similar to the series, stating that his intent was "to address the problems I had with Harvest Moon" and that "no title in the series ever brought it all together in a perfect way". Barone was also inspired by other games, including Animal Crossing, Rune Factory, Minecraft, and Terraria, adding features seen in those games such as crafting, quests, and combat. He was the sole developer on the game, creating all of the game's pixel art, music, sound effects, story and dialogue.

Initially, Barone considered releasing Stardew Valley on Xbox Live Indie Games due to the ease of publishing on that platform, but found early on that his scope for it became much larger than originally anticipated. Barone publicly announced the game in September 2012, using Steam's Greenlight system to gauge interest on the game. After the game was shown a great deal of support from the community, Barone began working on it in full, engaging with Reddit and Twitter communities to discuss his progress and gain feedback on proposed additions. Shortly after the Greenlight period in 2013, he was approached by Finn Brice, director of Chucklefish, who offered to help publish the game on release. Chucklefish took over many of the non-development activities for Barone, such as site hosting and setting up his development wiki. Barone decided not to use Steam's early access feature for development, as he felt that it was not well suited to Stardew Valley. Barone spent four years working on the project, redoing it multiple times and frequently spending 10 hours or more a day working on it. He originally programmed it in C# using the Microsoft XNA framework, but later migrated to MonoGame in 2021, which, according to Barone, "futureproofs the game and allows mods to access more than 4 gigs of RAM".

Barone aimed to give players the feeling of immersion in a small farming community, stating that he wanted Stardew Valley to be entertaining while also designing it to have "real-world messages". In contrast to earlier Harvest Moon games, which could end after two years of in-game time has passed, Barone kept Stardew Valley open-ended so that players would not feel rushed to try to complete everything possible. During development, Barone recognized that some players would attempt to figure out mechanically how to maximize their farm's yield and profit through spreadsheets and other tools, but hoped that most players would take the time to learn these on their own. To that end, he designed the cooking aspect of the game purposely not to be profitable, but instead to pay back in bonuses that aided exploration, farming, mining and fishing skills. Barone also opted not to include the butchering of farm animals for meat products, encouraging players to name and tend to each animal individually in staying with the feeling he wanted for the game. The animals cannot die but stop producing products if not tended to.

Release
In April 2015, Barone announced he intended to release the game only once he felt it was feature complete, refusing to put the game onto the Early Access program, or accept any pre-sale payments. The game was released for Windows on February 26, 2016. Following its release, Barone continued to work on the game, taking feedback from the community and patching bugs, and stated plans to add in additional features at a later date. Barone anticipated adding in more end-game content, as well as ports for other platforms. Barone had stated that he initially planned a four-player cooperative mode to be released in the game at launch. In this mode, Barone planned that all players would share a common farm, enabling players to all do different tasks related to it, such as one player mining while others tend to different parts of the farm. The multiplayer feature supports both local area network and remote online connectivity. Barone had planned for public beta testing of the multiplayer feature in late 2017 for the Windows version, but was still working to improve the network code by early 2018. The multiplayer beta for Windows was released in April 2018, with it officially launching for all PC platforms on August 1, 2018. In December 2018, the multiplayer update was released for the Nintendo Switch.

Mobile versions for iOS and Android were developed with help of The Secret Police, with the iOS version being released on October 24, 2018, and the Android version being released on March 14, 2019. Both versions include the ability for Windows, macOS, and Linux users to transfer progress to their device. In 2018, Barone stated his desire to assemble a team of developers to help continue further development of the game. By 2019, all versions of the game, except on mobile, were self-published by Barone. Stardew Valley has also seen an active modding community, with players adding various new features to the game.

In December 2019, Stardew Valley was added to the Tesla Arcade, a Linux-based video game service incorporated within most models of Tesla electric cars. A cooperative board game adaptation, Stardew Valley: The Board Game, was released in February 2021.

Chucklefish's involvement
In May 2016, Barone announced that publisher Chucklefish would help with non-English localizations, macOS, Linux, and console ports, and the technical aspects required for online co-operative play, allowing him to focus solely on the first major content update. The macOS and Linux ports were released on July 29, 2016. Ports for the PlayStation 4 and Xbox One were announced at E3 2016 in June. At the same event, Barone stated that a port for the Wii U was also to be released, although that version was later canceled in favor of a version for the Nintendo Switch. The PlayStation 4 and Xbox One versions were released respectively on December 13 and 14, 2016. The Switch version, ported by Sickhead Games, was released on October 5, 2017.

In early 2017, Barone stated his intentions for the possibility of a PlayStation Vita port, which was later confirmed and released on May 22, 2018. Retail versions for the PlayStation 4 and Xbox One are published and distributed by 505 Games. A collector's edition released at the same time included a physical map of the game's world, a download code for the soundtrack, and a guide book.

In December 2018, the publishing rights for all platforms outside of Android, iOS and Nintendo Switch reverted to Barone. This was followed by him regaining the rights for the Nintendo Switch release in October 2019, the official wiki in February 2021, the iOS release in December 2021, and the Android release in March 2022, ending Chucklefish's involvement.

Reception 

Stardew Valley received "generally favorable" reviews, according to review aggregator Metacritic. It has been cited by several publications to be among the greatest video games of all time.

Jesse Singal writing for The Boston Globe wrote that the game was "utterly compelling, lovingly crafted", and provided players with numerous varieties of activities to do without falling into a cycle of repetitive activities. Elise Favis of Game Informer found that watching her autistic brother play Stardew Valley helped her understand his condition better, as the game provides enough structure of present events with enough of a view of future events to allow her brother to enjoy the game. Yasuhiro Wada, the creator of the Harvest Moon series that Stardew Valley was inspired by, stated that he was "very happy" with the game, as it has shown to him that Harvest Moon was not a forgotten series and continued in spirit. He also stated that the approach taken by Barone with Stardew Valley was able to retain the freedom that he had wanted to keep in the Harvest Moon series that had been lost in the later games, with more focus on animation and graphics. Gamasutra named Barone one of the top ten developers for 2016, identifying that he had "single-handedly" developed something that "breathed new life into a genre" otherwise dominated by the Harvest Moon series. In 2017, Forbes named Barone one of their "30 Under 30" people to watch in the area of video games by citing his commitment towards making Stardew Valley. 

Many media outlets praised Stardew Valley for its LGBT options and representation, notably including the option for the player character to marry one of 12 villagers regardless of gender. Gayming Magazine praised the option for a player to engage in same-sex marriage, while also criticizing the lack of racial diversity. Paste described the game as being anti-capitalist, citing the negative portrayal of the fictional Joja Corporation.

Sales
Stardew Valley sold over 400,000 copies across Steam and GOG.com in two weeks, and more than a million within two months. Valve reported that Stardew Valley was in the top 24 revenue-generating games on Steam during 2016. Journalists noted that the gaming community had shown support for Barone for the game; while there had been some players who obtained the game illegally, these players were impressed with the game and stated they planned to purchase the game, while other players made offers to help pay for those who could not afford the game. An official sheet music book for piano and album was released in 2018 by label Materia Collective.

By the end of 2017, Stardew Valley had sold more than 3.5 million copies across all platforms. The game was also the most downloaded on the Nintendo Switch for 2017, despite only being released in October of that year. By May 2022, Stardew Valley had sold over 20 million copies across all platforms, with 13 million on PC.

Awards

Notes

References

External links 
 
 Official wiki

2016 video games
Android (operating system) games
Cancelled Wii U games
Farming video games
Golden Joystick Award winners
Indie video games
iOS games
Linux games
MacOS games
Microsoft XNA games
Multiplayer and single-player video games
Nintendo Switch games
PlayStation 4 games
PlayStation Network games
PlayStation Vita games
Retro-style video games
Role-playing video games
Steam Greenlight games
Social simulation video games
Video games developed in the United States
Video games featuring protagonists of selectable gender
Video games using procedural generation
Windows games
Xbox One games
505 Games games